Zinc finger protein 717 is a protein that in humans is encoded by the ZNF717 gene.

Function

This gene encodes a Kruppel-associated box (KRAB) zinc-finger protein, which belongs to a large group of transcriptional regulators in mammals. These proteins bind nucleic acids and play important roles in various cellular functions, including cell proliferation, differentiation and apoptosis, and in regulating viral replication and transcription. A pseudogene of this gene was identified on chromosome 1.

References

Further reading